Tildesley is a surname, and may refer to:

Dominic Tildesley (born 1952), a British chemist
Donovan Tildesley (born 1984), a blind Canadian swimmer
Jim Tildesley (1881–1963), English footballer
Mark Tildesley (production designer) (born 1963), British designer and director
Miriam Tildesley (1883–1979), English anthropologist
Murder of Mark Tildesley 1984 unsolved murder case

See also
Tyldesley, a town in Greater Manchester
Tyldesley (disambiguation)